Cristian Georgian Cherchez (born 1 February 1991) is a Romanian professional footballer who plays as a forward for ACS Roberto Ziduri. Born in Târgoviște, Cherchez has played all of his career for local teams FCM Târgoviște and Chindia Târgoviște.

Honours
Chindia Târgoviște
Liga II: 2018–19
Liga III: 2010–11, 2014–15

References

External links
 
 
 

1991 births
Living people
Sportspeople from Târgoviște
Romanian footballers
Association football forwards
Liga I players
Liga II players
Liga III players
FCM Târgoviște players
AFC Chindia Târgoviște players